Simon James Greenall (born 3 January 1958) is an English actor, presenter, comedian, voice actor, producer, and writer. Among his television appearances are as the Caretaker on Trapped!, Richard in Lucy Sullivan is Getting Married, and as Michael the Geordie in the Alan Partridge programs and films. He also voices Captain Barnacles in the Octonauts franchise, the twins in the Shaun the Sheep films, and Aleksandr Orlov and Sergei the meerkats in the comparethemarket.com adverts.

Early life
Greenall was born on 3 January 1958 in Longtown, Cumberland. He attended the Manchester School of Theatre at the same time as Steve Coogan, who was two years below him and would later become a repeat collaborator.

Career
Greenall has appeared in a number of television shows, shorts, movies, and video games. Earlier roles include as policemen in Life Without George (1987), One Foot in the Grave (1990), and Between the Lines (1993); as various characters in Alexei Sayle's Merry-Go-Round (1998), Pond Life (2000), and Monkey Dust (2003); and as the voices of Mr. Bump, Mr. Grumpy, and Mr. Happy in The Mr. Men Show (2008). He voiced Murgo in the Fable video game franchise and replaced Cam Clarke in Final Fantasy XIV as the voice of Lord Lolorito, in addition to his regular voiceover role the dragon Nidhogg. In the 2006 Doctor Who episode "Love & Monsters", he played Mr. Skinner.

Greenall has also starred on the BBC Radio shows On the Blog, Missing Hancocks, and The Simon Day Show. He won Celebrity Mastermind in 2015 with the specialist subject D-Day landings and was credited as co-executive producer of the 2011 film adaptation of We Need to Talk About Kevin. He currently voices Aleksandr Orlov the meerkat in the comparethemarket.com adverts.

When Grant Bovey was training for a BBC charity boxing match against Ricky Gervais, Greenall was one of Bovey's sparring partners. In 1995, he won a Writers' Guild of Great Britain Awards honour in the TV - Light Entertainment category along with Harry Enfield, Geoffrey Perkins, Harry Thompson, Paul Whitehouse, Ian Hislop, Nick Newman and Kay Stonham for Harry Enfield's Television Programme. In 2014, he was awarded an honorary fellowship from the University of Cumbria.

Selected works

Television

Film

Video Games

References

External links
 
 Simon Greenall at United Agents

1958 births
Living people
20th-century English male actors
21st-century English male actors
Alumni of Manchester Metropolitan University
English male film actors
English male radio actors
English male stage actors
English male television actors
English male video game actors
English male voice actors
People from the City of Carlisle
People from Cumberland